The Solothurn S-18/1100 was a Swiss 20 mm anti-tank rifle used during the Second World War by a number of combatants.

History 
As a result of the defeat of the central-powers during World War I and the subsequent Treaty of Versailles, Germany was forbidden from developing arms.  In order to circumvent these limitations many German arms firms opened foreign subsidiaries or bought controlling interests to continue designing and selling arms.  One of these companies was the Swiss Solothurn company which was owned by the German firm Rheinmetall.

Design 
The S-18/1100 started life as a selective fire variant of the earlier S-18/1000 anti-tank rifle. As a result of its powerful ammunition, the gun had tremendous recoil. Also, its length and weight made portability difficult, so a two-wheeled split-trail carriage was provided. Once towed into position the gun could be fired from the carriage or dismounted and fired from a bipod for the anti-tank role. In addition to its anti-tank role it was offered with a collapsible high-angle mount with three outriggers so it could function as a light anti-aircraft gun.

Service 
In addition to being used by the Swiss, it also saw service with Hungary as the Tankbuchse, Italy as the Fucile anticarro, Germany as the 2 cm PzB785(s) and The Netherlands as the Geweer tp 18-1100.  Guns captured by the Germans were given the designations 2 cm PzB785(h) and 2 cm PzB785(i).

References 

20mm sniper rifles
20 mm artillery
Anti-tank rifles
Military equipment introduced in the 1930s